Halifax Media Group was an American newspaper company owning more than 30 newspapers in five Southeastern U.S. States. It was founded on March 31, 2010 when a group of investors purchased The Daytona Beach News-Journal from the Davidson family, who had owned it for 82 years. On December 27, 2011, The New York Times Company announced it was selling its Regional Media Group to Halifax Media Group. On June 1, 2012, Halifax announced it was acquiring the Florida and North Carolina papers of Freedom Communications. In 2013, Halifax acquired three newspapers from HarborPoint Media: the Daily Commercial of Leesburg, Florida, the South Lake Press in Clermont, Florida and News-Sun of Sebring, Florida. In 2014, Halifax acquired the Telegram & Gazette of Worcester, Massachusetts. In November 2014, New Media Investment Group announced its acquisition of Halifax. The company was created with the assistance of Stephens Inc.

In 2015, GateHouse Media purchased the 36 newspapers then owned by Halifax Media.  In 2019, GateHouse Media merged with Gannett, Inc., owner of the USA Today and more than 100 other daily newspapers.

Assets
The Halifax Media Group owns the following assets:

Alabama
The Gadsden Times of Gadsden, Alabama
The Tuscaloosa News of Tuscaloosa, Alabama

Florida
 Daily Commercial of Leesburg, Florida
 The Daytona Beach News-Journal of Daytona Beach, Florida
 The Gainesville Sun of Gainesville, Florida
 The Ledger of Lakeland, Florida
 News Chief of Winter Haven, Florida
 The News Herald of Panama City
 Northwest Florida Daily News of Fort Walton Beach
 Sarasota Herald-Tribune of Sarasota, Florida
 Star-Banner of Ocala, Florida
 Weekly newspapers:
 Crestview News Bulletin of Crestview
 The Destin Log of Destin
 Eglin Dispatch of Eglin Air Force Base
 Holmes County Times-Advertiser of Bonifay
 Hurlburt Warrior of Hurlburt Field
 News-Sun of Sebring
 Press Gazette of Milton
 South Lake Press of Clermont
 The Star of Port St. Joe
 The Times of Apalachicola
 The Walton Sun of Santa Rosa Beach
 Washington County News of Chipley

Louisiana
The Daily Comet, Thibodaux, Louisiana
The Houma Courier, Houma, Louisiana

Massachusetts
Telegram & Gazette of Worcester, Massachusetts

North Carolina
The Dispatch of Lexington, North Carolina
 The Daily News of Jacksonville
 The Gaston Gazette of Gastonia
 The Free Press of Kinston
Times-News of Hendersonville, North Carolina
 The Shelby Star of Shelby
 Star-News of Wilmington, North Carolina
 Sun Journal of New Bern
 Times-News of Burlington
 Weekly newspapers:
 The Havelock News of Havelock
 Jones Post of Trenton
 The Topsail Advertiser of Surf City

South Carolina
Spartanburg Herald-Journal of Spartanburg, South Carolina

References

External links

Newspaper companies of the United States
Mass media companies established in 2010
2010 establishments in Florida
Privately held companies based in Florida
Gannett
2014 mergers and acquisitions